A former municipality (Danish, kommune) in Region Nordjylland on the Jutland Peninsula in northern Denmark. Its last mayor was Jens Lauritzen, a member of the Venstre (Liberal Party) political party.

A bridge connects the former municipality near Tolstrup to the town of Aggersund on the far side of the Agger Strait.

The island of Livø lies off the former municipality's western shores, and is partially a protected nature reserve.

On 1 January 2007, Løgstør municipality ceased to exist as a result of Kommunalreformen ("The Municipality Reform" of 2007).

Shield of Løgstør Municipality
The former municipality's shield was a purple/blue shield. The arms were officially registered in 1984. The main part of the arms symbolises the Viking fortress in Aggersund, a ring fortress with 12 barracks. The waves symbolise the Aggersund, the part of the Limfjord that divides the municipality into two parts. Before 1984 the municipality used the arms of the town of Løgstør, designed in 1900.

Mayor

References

Former municipalities of Denmark